Golden is a modern art sculpture installed in the Chatterley Valley, on the outskirts of Tunstall, Stoke-on-Trent in May 2015. The £180,000 artwork is installed on the site of the former Goldendale Ironworks and was designed by the award-winning public art sculptor Wolfgang Buttress, who designed the Rise sculpture in Belfast. It is one of the tallest public art sculptures in Britain. The site was previously occupied by the Potteries Pyramid, which has been erroneously placed there since 2007.

Funding
The sculpture was privately funded using £180,000 of Section 106 monies set aside to provide new public art or maintain current public art in the area. The money was secured following the construction of the Blue Planet eco-warehouse built by construction firm Glazeley further along the Chatterley Valley, in the neighbouring borough of Newcastle-under-Lyme. Stoke-on-Trent city council put the project out to tender in February 2011 and a number of designs were put forward.

Design
The 69 ft (21m) sculpture is made from COR-TEN Steel, the same material as the Angel of the North and was fabricated in Nottingham. The tapered lozenge design, shaped to evoke a solitary flame such as lit the Chatterley Valley during the heyday of the Iron Works, features powerful colour changing LED lights that will illuminate 1,500 hand blown glass prisms containing wishes or memories of local residents written on handmade paper. Each prism will be held out from the main body of the sculpture by a short stalk, giving the artwork a bristly appearance. Local arts group Letting In The Light were commissioned by artist Wolfgang Buttress to collect the wishes and memories, although people won't be able to see the actual messages once the sculpture is installed, the not-for-profit organisation plans to publish them in an accompanying book.

See also 
 Angel of the North
 Dream sculpture
 Rise sculpture

References

Steel sculptures in England
2013 sculptures
Outdoor sculptures in England
Weathering steel
Tourist attractions in Stoke-on-Trent
Buildings and structures in Stoke-on-Trent
Culture in Stoke-on-Trent